]

Mersenius is a lunar impact crater that is located to the west of the Mare Humorum, in the southwestern part of the Moon. To the southwest is the crater Cavendish, and to the south-southeast lies Liebig. Mersenius is 84 kilometers in diameter and 2.3 kilometers deep. It is from the Nectarian period, 3.92 to 3.85 billion years ago.

The rim of Mersenius is heavily worn, especially in the low northern section. The crater Mersenius N lies across the southwestern rim. The interior has been flooded by basaltic lava, which bulges upwards forming a convex domed shape with an estimated height of 450 metres relative to the floor edges. This was most likely formed by lava upwelling beneath the surface. There are several tiny craterlets across the floor surface, but little in the way of a central peak. At least two faint rilles lie along the surface of the floor.

To the east of the crater on the surface and edges of the Mare Humorum is a rille system designated Rimae Mersenius. These rilles are generally parallel and run to the north-northeast for a length of about 230 kilometers.

The crater is named after the 17th-century French philosopher and physicist Marin Mersenne.

Satellite craters
By convention these features are identified on lunar maps by placing the letter on the side of the crater midpoint that is closest to Mersenius.

References

 

Impact craters on the Moon
Nectarian